Farmer's Pole is a 1984 cedar totem pole designed by Marvin Oliver, created by artist James Bender and commissioned by architect Victor Steinbrueck, installed in Seattle's Victor Steinbrueck Park, in the U.S. state of Washington.

Description and history
Marvin oliver designed it, Bender carved the totem, and Steinbrueck commissioned it.

The totem is mostly smooth, with the exception of one male and one female figure.

See also

 1984 in art

References

1984 establishments in Washington (state)
1984 sculptures
Downtown Seattle
Outdoor sculptures in Seattle
Sculptures of men in Washington (state)
Sculptures of women in Washington (state)
Totem poles in the United States
Wooden sculptures in Washington (state)